West Fork San Juan River is a tributary of the San Juan River in Minerala and Archuleta counties in Colorado, United States.  The stream flows from a source near South River Peak in Mineral County to a confluence with the East Fork San Juan River in Archuleta County that forms the San Juan River.

See also

 List of rivers of Colorado
 List of tributaries of the Colorado River

References

External links

Rivers of Colorado
Rivers of Archuleta County, Colorado
Rivers of Mineral County, Colorado